Niue competed at the 2022 Commonwealth Games in Birmingham, England from 28 July to 8 August 2022. It was Niue's sixth appearance at the Games.

The Niue team of 15 athletes (ten men and five women), competing in three sports, was named on 20 June 2022.

Boxer Travis Tapatuetoa and lawn bowler Olivia Buckingham were the delegation's flagbearers during the opening ceremony.

Boxer Duken Tutakitoa-Williams became Niue's first ever Commonwealth Games medallist when he won a bronze medal in the men's heavyweight event.

Competitors
The following is the list of number of competitors participating at the Games per sport/discipline.

Medallists

| style="text-align:left; vertical-align:top;"|

Boxing

A squad of four boxers was officially selected as of 20 June 2022.

Men

Lawn bowls

A squad of ten bowlers was officially selected as of 20 June 2022. It includes Dalton Tagelagi, who notably will compete during his tenure as the Premier of Niue.

Men

Women

Weightlifting

Niue accepted a Bipartite Invitation for the weightlifting competition and selected Giovanni Toimata to compete. Toimata travelled to Birmingham, but was excluded from competition by the Commonwealth Games Federation following a mix-up with paperwork.

References

External links
Niue Island Amateur Sports Association Facebook site

Nations at the 2022 Commonwealth Games
2022
2022 in Niue